Interstate 210 (I-210) in Louisiana, also known as the Lake Charles Bypass, is a  bypass route in Lake Charles, in the southwestern part of the state. As a bypass of I-10, both ends of I-210 meet with I-10.

Route description

The western terminus connects with I-10 east of Sulphur, heading southeast as it bypasses central Lake Charles around the southside.  east of the western terminus, I-210 rises over the Israel LaFleur Bridge, one of the highest bridges in the Interstate Highway System, to pass over the Calcasieu Ship Channel. At the southeastern end of the bridge, the highway meets with exit 3, Prien Lake Road, eastbound. I-210 heads east through Lake Charles, turning 90 degrees at exit 8, LA 14/Gerstner Memorial Drive. The highway then heads north toward its eastern terminus with I-10 just east of Lake Charles. Though portions of the freeway run north–south, the entire route is signed east–west.

All of I-210 is included as part of the National Highway System, a system of roadways important to the nation's economy, defense, and mobility.

History
I-210, including the Israel LaFleur Bridge, was constructed between its western terminus and Prien Lake Road circa 1963 to 1965. Initially, the western terminus at I-10 consisted solely of eastbound entrance and westbound exit ramps. The eastern remainder of I-210 was built circa 1975 to 1976, and westbound entrance / eastbound exit ramps were added to the western terminus in 1986.

Much of the area surrounding I-210 in southern Lake Charles was developed prior to construction of the freeway. As a result, many homes and businesses in its path were demolished.

The freeway remained largely unchanged from its original configuration until 2005, when construction of the L'Auberge du Lac Casino Resort resulted in the addition of a ramp linked to the Nelson Road interchange. Between 2013 and 2015, the Prien Lake Road interchange was rebuilt to allow access to the Golden Nugget Lake Charles.

During the planning phase of the freeway, it was known as the South City Bypass. Older signage (prior to the 2000s) referred to the road as the Lake Charles Loop.

Exit list

References

See also

10-2 Louisiana
210
10-2
Lake Charles, Louisiana
Transportation in Calcasieu Parish, Louisiana